Eager Bodies is a 2003 French drama film directed by Xavier Giannoli.

Cast 
 Laura Smet - Charlotte
 Nicolas Duvauchelle - Paul
 Marie Denarnaud - Ninon
  - La Mère

References

External links 

2003 drama films
2003 films
French drama films
Films about cancer in France
2000s French films